Maja Nylén Persson (born 20 November 2000) is a Swedish ice hockey player for Brynäs IF in the SDHL and the Swedish national team.

Career  
Nylén Persson grew up cheering for Leksands IF, and would make her SDHL debut for the club at the age of 13. She would play five seasons for the club, scoring over 60 points. In March 2019, she became won the EliteProspects Award for the SDHL's youth player of the year, the first time the trophy had been awarded. She would win the award again the next season.

After graduating from high school, she left Leksands to sign a three-year contract with Brynäs. She would score 26 points in 36 games in her first season with Brynäs, serving as an assistant captain.

International  
She was part of the Swedish squad that won gold at the 2016 Winter Youth Olympics. She would make her senior national team debut at the 2017 IIHF Women's World Championship.

Career Statistics

References

External links

2000 births
Living people
Swedish women's ice hockey defencemen
People from Avesta Municipality
Ice hockey players at the 2016 Winter Youth Olympics
Olympic ice hockey players of Sweden
Ice hockey players at the 2018 Winter Olympics
Ice hockey players at the 2022 Winter Olympics
Youth Olympic gold medalists for Sweden
Brynäs IF Dam players
Leksands IF Dam players
Sportspeople from Dalarna County